Part of a series of articles upon Archaeology of Kosovo

The village of Nikadin (Nicodemus), nowadays a suburban part of the town of Ferizaj, is situated only 2 kilometers south from the town, sited in a spacious and fertile countryside. During the 1960s, superficial traces of a Roman villa complex have been recorded here. Nevertheless, during gardening carried out in front of a house, accidentally a remarkable sarcophagus lid was unearthed, a rare and unique for the region of Kosovo. A sarcophagus is a funeral receptacle for a corpse, most commonly carved from marble or limestone. The sarcophagus lid discovered here is carved in marbled limestone in the shape of a house roof and decorated on the sides with anthropomorphic human bust, while on the front of the lid,
decorated with floral motifs.

The sarcophagus lid was carved during the end of the 3rd or the beginning of the 4th century AD. The accidental discovery of the lid, lead towards the rescue excavation investigation (2007) carried out in form of trial trenches. The results of this archaeological research were unexpected, while a small unknown early Christian church (4th -6th century AD) was unearthed (though very damaged). Taking into account that, the church was
constructed by stones bonded with lime mortar, but the most interesting discoveries were the spolia (the re-use of earlier building material or decorative sculpture on new monuments) of the Roman date.

See also 
Roman Dardania
Roman cities in Illyria
Archaeology of Kosovo
Roman Period Sites in Kosovo
Neolithic Sites in Kosovo
Copper, Bronze and Iron Age Sites in Kosovo
Late Antiquity and Medieval Sites in Kosovo

References 

Illyrian Kosovo
Archaeology of Illyria
Dardanians
Moesia
Dardania (Roman province)
Roman towns and cities in Kosovo
Archaeological sites in Kosovo